Enzo Valentim (born 11 September 2000) is a French professional footballer, who plays as a right-back for Championnat National 2 club Créteil.

He has also received a call up to the France national under-18 football team in 2018.

Club career

Tours FC
A member of Tours's youth academy since 2011, Valentim made his professional debut for Tours in a 3–2 Ligue 2 loss to Gazélec Ajaccio on 20 April 2018.

Reims
On 3 July 2018, Valentim joined Ligue 1 club Reims, where he would initially play for the reserve side, making fourteen appearances for the B team in the Championnat National 2 during the 2018–19 season.

In July 2019, Valentim was used in Reims's first team during the 2019–20 pre-season.

International career
Valentim is able to represent France or Portugal at international level. 

Valentim was called up to represent the France national under-18 football team for a pair of friendlies in February 2018.

References

External links
 
 
 
 
 

Living people
2000 births
Sportspeople from Tours, France
Association football fullbacks
French footballers
French people of Portuguese descent
Tours FC players
Ligue 2 players
Footballers from Centre-Val de Loire